The 2011 Monaco GP2 Round was the third round of the 2011 GP2 Series season. It was held on May 26–28, 2011 at Circuit de Monaco, Monte Carlo, Monaco, supporting the 2011 Monaco Grand Prix. GP2's feeder formula GP3 did not appear at this event.

Classification

Qualifying

Notes
 – Giedo van der Garde was handed a five grid position penalty for causing a collision in the session with Oliver Turvey.
 – Jules Bianchi was handed a five grid position penalty for causing a collision with van der Garde in Barcelona Sprint Race.
 – Marcus Ericsson was handed a five grid position penalty for causing a collision with Sam Bird during the qualifying session.
 – Romain Grosjean was handed a five grid position penalty for causing a collision with Pål Varhaug during the qualifying session.  Although he did not set a laptime inside the 107%, Grosjean has been allowed to race as he set a suitable time during the practice session.

Feature Race

Notes
 – Oliver Turvey was handed a 30-second time penalty for failing to take a drive through penalty awarded for a jump start.

Sprint Race

Notes
 – Sam Bird was handed a five place grid penalty for causing a collision with Marcus Ericsson during Feature Race.

Standings after the round

Drivers' Championship standings

Teams' Championship standings

 Note: Only the top five positions are included for both sets of standings.

External links
 GP2 Series official web site: Results

References

Monaco
GP2
Motorsport in Monaco